Eye of the Storm, was the fifth studio album released by the German heavy metal band Stormwitch in 1989 and the final album that features the original line up. The album is the band's least heavy release to date, featuring several ballads ("I Want You Around", "Take Me Home"). It is not one of Stormwitch's best received albums.

The album features a guitar played extract of Mozart's "Rondo Ala Turca" (from Mozart's Piano Sonata No. 11 (Mozart)).

Track listing
 "Eye of the Storm" - 3:46
 "Tarred and Feathered" - 3:43
 "Heart of Ice" - 3:59
 "Rondo Ala Turca" - 3:10
 "I Want You Around" - 4:22
 "King in the Ring" - 5:09
 "Paradise" - 3:43
 "Take Me Home" - 3:59
 "Steel in the Red Light" - 4:09
 "Another World Apart" - 3:43

Reissued on March 7, 2005 by Battle Cry Records (formerly Iron Glory Records) with these bonus live tracks:
 "Eye of the Storm"
 "King in the Ring"
 "The Beauty and the Beast"
 "Tears by the Firelight"
 "Rondo a la Turca"
 "Dragon's Day"
 "Tigers of the Sea" 
 "Silent Mood"

Personnel
 Andy Mück alias Andy Aldrian – vocals
 Lee Tarot – guitars
 Steve Merchant – guitars
 Andy Hunter – bass
 Pete Lancer – drums

References

1989 albums
Stormwitch albums